Stanislav Huml (30 July 1955 – 28 December 2021) was a Czech police officer and politician who served as a member of the Chamber of Deputies of the Czech Republic from 2011 into his death in 2021. He supported a number of conspiracy theories. He died on 28 December 2021 from COVID-19, at the age of 66.

References

1955 births
2021 deaths
Czech politicians
Czech jurists
Czech police officers
Czech conspiracy theorists
9/11 conspiracy theorists
Deaths from the COVID-19 pandemic in the Czech Republic
People from Odolena Voda
Communist Party of Czechoslovakia politicians
SNK European Democrats politicians
Czech Social Democratic Party MPs
Members of the Chamber of Deputies of the Czech Republic (2010–2013)
Members of the Chamber of Deputies of the Czech Republic (2013–2017)